This is a list of prime ministers of the Czech Socialist Republic.

1 January 1969 – 5 March 1990: called "Czech Socialist Republic" within the Czechoslovak Socialist Republic.
6 March 1990 – 31 December 1992: called "Czech Republic" within the Czech and Slovak Federative Republic.

Stanislav Rázl: 8 January – 29 September 1969
Josef Kempný: 29 September 1969 – 28 January 1970
Josef Korčák: 28 January 1970 – 20 March 1987
Ladislav Adamec: 20 March 1987 – 12 October 1988
František Pitra: 12 October 1988 – 6 February 1990 
Petr Pithart: 6 February 1990 – 2 July 1992
Václav Klaus: 2 July 1992 – 31 December 1992

See also
List of rulers of Bohemia
List of presidents of Czechoslovakia
List of prime ministers of Czechoslovakia
List of rulers of the Protectorate Bohemia and Moravia
President of the Czech Republic
List of presidents of the Czech Republic
Prime Minister of the Czech Republic
List of prime ministers of the Czech Republic
Lists of office-holders

Lists of political office-holders in Czechoslovakia
Prime Ministers